Wyman Chester Smith (December 2, 1898 – August 16, 1953), nicknamed "Subway", was an American Negro league outfielder in the 1920s.

A native of Baltimore, Maryland, Smith made his Negro leagues debut in 1920 for the Baltimore Black Sox. He went on to play four more seasons with the Black Sox, through 1924. Smith died in Baltimore in 1953 at age 54.

References

External links
 and Baseball-Reference Black Baseball stats and Seamheads

1898 births
1953 deaths
Baltimore Black Sox players
Baseball players from Baltimore
Baseball outfielders
20th-century African-American sportspeople